The Americas Zone was one of the three zones of the regional Davis Cup competition in 1996.

In the Americas Zone there were three different tiers, called groups, in which teams competed against each other to advance to the upper tier. Winners in Group III advanced to the Americas Zone Group II in 1997. In a move to a four-tier system, the bottom three teams were re-assigned to the new Group IV in 1997; all other teams remained in Group III.

Participating nations

Draw
 Venue: Maya Country Club, San Salvador, El Salvador
 Date: 6–10 March

Group A

Group B

  and  promoted to Group II in 1997.
 ,  and  assigned to Group IV in 1997.

Group A

Costa Rica vs. Haiti

Dominican Republic vs. Trinidad and Tobago

Antigua and Barbuda vs. Dominican Republic

Costa Rica vs. Trinidad and Tobago

Antigua and Barbuda vs. Trinidad and Tobago

Dominican Republic vs. Haiti

Antigua and Barbuda vs. Costa Rica

Haiti vs. Trinidad and Tobago

Antigua and Barbuda vs. Haiti

Costa Rica vs. Dominican Republic

Group B

El Salvador vs. Eastern Caribbean

Bermuda vs. Panama

Bolivia vs. Jamaica

El Salvador vs. Bermuda

Bolivia vs. Panama

Eastern Caribbean vs. Jamaica

El Salvador vs. Panama

Bermuda vs. Jamaica

Bolivia vs. Eastern Caribbean

El Salvador vs. Jamaica

Bermuda vs. Bolivia

Eastern Caribbean vs. Panama

El Salvador vs. Bolivia

Bermuda vs. Eastern Caribbean

Jamaica vs. Panama

References

External links
Davis Cup official website

Davis Cup Americas Zone
Americas Zone Group III